Barry Leon Hampton (born 16 January 1941) is a former New Zealand cricketer who played first-class cricket for Central Districts from 1961 to 1968.

A middle-order batsman and economical medium-pace bowler, he made his highest score, 107, for Central Districts against Canterbury in 1967-68, when he and Bryan Yuile added 219 for the seventh wicket. His best bowling figures were 6 for 7 (match figures of 33–23–19–8), when Central Districts dismissed Otago for 82 in 1963-64.

He also played Hawke Cup cricket for Nelson from 1960 to 1975, and was named in the Hawke Cup Team of the Century in 2011. In 1963-64, when Nelson were defending their title, he scored 236 against Waikato. Nelson's total of 632 was a Hawke Cup record at the time.

References

External links
 
 

1941 births
Living people
New Zealand cricketers
Central Districts cricketers
People from Westport, New Zealand